Liupanshui Yuezhao Airport  is an airport serving the city of Liupanshui in western Guizhou Province, China.  It is located in Yuezhao Township, Zhongshan District and Dongdi Township, Shuicheng County, 15 kilometers from the city center by road.  Construction began on September 26, 2011 with a total investment of 1.3 billion yuan, and the airport was opened on 28 November 2014.

Facilities
Liupanshui Airport will have a runway that is 2,800 meters long and 45 meters wide (class 4C), capable of handling Boeing 737 and Airbus 320 aircraft, and an 8,000 square-meter terminal building.  It is designed to handle 250,000 passengers and 1,250 tons of cargo annually by 2020.

Airlines and destinations

See also
List of airports in China
List of the busiest airports in China

References

Airports in Guizhou
Airports established in 2014
2014 establishments in China
Buildings and structures in Liupanshui